Hiroshi Yoshida is a former wushu taolu athlete from Japan. He is a four-time medalist at the World Wushu Championships and is a one-time world champion. He also won the bronze medal in men's changquan at the 1994 Asian Games.

See also 

 List of Asian Games medalists in wushu

References 

Japanese wushu practitioners
Wushu practitioners at the 1994 Asian Games
Wushu practitioners at the 1998 Asian Games
Asian Games silver medalists for Japan
Asian Games medalists in wushu
Medalists at the 1994 Asian Games